{{DISPLAYTITLE:12 m2 Sharpie}}

The 12 m2 Sharpie was a type of Sharpie designed in 1931 by the Kröger Brothers in Warnemünde, Germany. The peak of the class was in the 1956 Melbourne Olympic Games. To this day, the original design has been preserved, and the class is sailed competitively in the UK, The Netherlands, Germany, and Portugal.
The European Championships are rotated between these four countries every year.   
   
The term 'Twelve Square Metre' evolves from the original sail area, though on modern sharpies due to modern sail designs has now reached to around sixteen square metres.   

Past Australian champions to have passed through the ranks include Sir James Hardy, John Cuneo, Rolly Tasker and John Bertrand. Rolly Tasker won Australia's first sailing medal at the 1956 Olympic Games in Melbourne when he and John Scott won a silver medal in their 12 m2 Sharpie.

The 12 m2 Sharpie is one of the Vintage classes for the 2018 Vintage Yachting Games.

There are still a small number of original sharpies in Australia and Brasil, though they have not been sailed competitively on International level since the 1960s. In Australia, the original 'heavyweight' Sharpie has now evolved into the lightweight Australian Sharpie.

When racing in a mixed fleet, the 12 m2 Sharpie has a Portsmouth number of 1026.

Events

Olympics

References

Dinghies
Olympic sailing classes
1930s sailboat type designs
Sailboat type designs by German designers
12m² Sharpie
Former classes of World Sailing